No. 113 Squadron began service in 1917 with the Egyptian Expeditionary Force commanded by General Edmund Allenby. Initially, the squadron was a unit of the Royal Flying Corps, serving during the Sinai and Palestine Campaign and as a reconnaissance, army cooperation, bomber, fighter, transport and missile operation squadron during its existence.

History

Formation in World War I as reconnaissance unit
No. 113 Squadron was formed on 1 August 1917 at what became RAF Ismailia, Egypt, as a corps reconnaissance and army co-operation unit, taking over duties of trench reconnaissance from No. 1 Squadron Australian Flying Corps, otherwise known as 67 (Australian) Squadron RFC. In September it began tactical reconnaissance and artillery spotting missions over Palestine, where it remained until the end of World War I. The squadron returned to Egypt on 16 February 1919 and a year later it was disbanded by being renumbered to No. 208 Squadron RAF on 1 February 1920.

1937 – 1945
No. 113 reformed at RAF Upper Heyford on 18 May 1937 as a day bomber unit, equipped with Hawker Hinds. In April 1938 it left for the Middle East, converting to the Bristol Bisley/Blenheim in June 1939. After Italy joined the war, on 11 June 1940 the unit participated in the first attack by the RAF on the Italian air force base at El Adem, where 18 aircraft were destroyed or damaged on the ground, against the loss of three British aircraft from three squadrons. The squadron then moved to Greece in March 1941. There it was overtaken by the German invasion and lost all its aircraft, the squadron personnel being evacuated to Crete and Egypt. Bombing operations in North Africa resumed in June 1941.

No. 113 Squadron was selected for a special operation in November 1941, as Allied ground forces began Operation Crusader. From a temporary airfield behind enemy lines in Libya – LG-215 (at 30°18′5″N 22°54′0″E) which had been prepared by the Long Range Desert Group – the squadron was to attack Axis rear area supply lines. The Blenheims were escorted by Hurricanes from No. 33 Squadron RAF.  Their aircraft were spotted by a German reconnaissance flight on 21 November, and the following day LG-215 was attacked by Ju 88s, resulting in damage to many of the Blenheims. The operation was considered to be a success, and No. 113 Squadron afterwards flew to Ma'aten Bagush, Egypt beyond the range of German bombers.

After the outbreak of war with Japan the squadron was redeployed to Burma. At this point it was made up predominantly of personnel from other Commonwealth countries, particularly personnel from the Royal Australian Air Force (RAAF), and was commanded by a Rhodesian, Wing Commander Reginald Stidolph, DFC. It arrived in Burma on 7 January 1942 and immediately participated in the first allied bombing attack on Bangkok. A second raid was undertaken on 24 January. The squadron suffered heavy casualties while attacking Japanese columns in Burma and the survivors withdrew to Calcutta in March. From Assam, No. 113 bombed Japanese communications and airfields. At least 16 RAAF personnel were killed in action with the squadron as a Blenheim unit in Burma and India.

In March 1943 the squadron was reformed as a ground-attack unit and converted to Hurricanes. These were replaced by Thunderbolts in April 1945. The squadron was disbanded following the war's end, on 15 October 1945.

Post war reformations as a transport squadron
On 1 September 1946 No. 620 Squadron RAF at RAF Aqir was renumbered to No. 113 Squadron RAF and was engaged in transport duties with Halifax A.7s until disbanded on 1 April 1947. The squadron reformed on 1 May 1947 at RAF Fairford now flying Douglas Dakotas alongside Halifax A.9s, being disbanded on 1 September 1948.

On Thor missiles
The squadron was reformed – as 113 (SM) Squadron – on 22 July 1959 as one of 20 Strategic Missile (SM) squadrons associated with Project Emily. The squadron was equipped with three Thor Intermediate range ballistic missiles, based at RAF Mepal.

In October 1962, during the Cuban Missile Crisis, the squadron was kept at full readiness, with the missiles aimed at strategic targets in the Union of Soviet Socialist Republics. The squadron was disbanded on 10 July 1963, with the termination of the Thor Program in Britain.

Commanding officers

Aircraft operated

See also
 List of UK Thor missile bases
 List of Royal Air Force aircraft squadrons

References

Citations

Bibliography

 Bowyer, Michael J.F. and John D.R. Rawlings. Squadron Codes, 1937–56. Cambridge, UK: Patrick Stephens Ltd., 1979. .
 
 Flintham, Vic and Andrew Thomas. Combat Codes: A full explanation and listing of British, Commonwealth and Allied air force unit codes since 1938. Shrewsbury, Shropshire, UK: Airlife Publishing Ltd., 2003. .
 Halley, James J. The Squadrons of the Royal Air Force & Commonwealth 1918–1988. Tonbridge, Kent, UK: Air Britain (Historians) Ltd., 1988. .
 Jefford, C.G. RAF Squadrons, a Comprehensive record of the Movement and Equipment of all RAF Squadrons and their Antecedents since 1912. Shrewsbury, Shropshire, UK: Airlife Publishing, 1988 (second edition 2001). .
 Moyes, Philip J.R. Bomber Squadrons of the RAF and their Aircraft. London: Macdonald and Jane's (Publishers) Ltd., 2nd edition 1976. .

 Rawlings, John D.R. Fighter Squadrons of the RAF and their Aircraft. London: Macdonald & Jane's (Publishers) Ltd., 1969 (2nd edition 1976, reprinted 1978). .
 Embry, Sir Basil (1976) [1957]. Mission Completed. London: White Lion Publications. .

External links

 Squadron history of No. 113 Squadron at their own site.
 The official history of 113 Squadron on RAF site
 History of No.'s 111–115 Squadrons at RAF Web

113
113
Aircraft squadrons of the Royal Air Force in World War II
Military units and formations established in 1917
Military units and formations disestablished in 1963
1917 establishments in the United Kingdom